Mary of Scotland (1082–1116) was the younger daughter of Malcolm III of Scotland and his second wife, Margaret of Wessex. Mary was a member of the House of Dunkeld by birth, and was Countess of Boulogne by marriage.

In 1086, Mary and her sister, Matilda, were sent by their parents to Romsey Abbey. Their maternal aunt, Christina, was abbess there. The girls spent their early life at the monastery with their aunt, where they also received part of their education. Some time before 1093, they went to Wilton Abbey, which also had a reputation as a centre of learning, to finish their education. Matilda received many proposals for marriage but refused them all for the time being.

Matilda finally left the monastery in 1100 to marry King Henry I of England. The marriage was controversial because it was not clear whether the girls had been veiled as nuns. Mary herself left the abbey in 1096. Matilda wanted her to also marry, so Henry I arranged a match with Eustace III, Count of Boulogne. The couple had a daughter, Matilda, who succeeded Eustace and later became Queen of England.

Mary died in 1116, nine years before her husband. She was buried at the Cluniac abbey at Bermondsey.

References 

1082 births
1116 deaths
Anglo-Normans
Mary
Countesses of Boulogne
Scottish princesses
Anglo-Norman women
11th-century Scottish women
11th-century Scottish people
12th-century Scottish women
12th-century Scottish people
11th-century English women
11th-century English people
12th-century English women
12th-century English people
Daughters of kings